Henry Silva (September 23, 1926  – September 14, 2022) was an American actor. A prolific character actor, Silva was a regular staple of international genre cinema, usually playing criminals or gangsters. His notable film appearances include ones in Ocean's 11 (1960), The Manchurian Candidate (1962), Johnny Cool (1963), Sharky's Machine (1981), and Ghost Dog: The Way of the Samurai (1999).

Early life and career

Silva was born in Brooklyn, New York City, on September 23, 1926. He was the son of Jesus Silva and Angelina Martinez, and was of Sicilian and Spanish descent. His father abandoned the family when he was young, and he grew up in Spanish Harlem with his mother. He quit school when he was 13 years old to attend drama classes, supporting himself as a dishwasher and waiter at a Manhattan hotel.

By 1955, Silva felt ready to audition for the Actors Studio. He was accepted. When the Studio staged Michael V. Gazzo's play A Hatful of Rain as a classroom project (which itself grew out of an earlier improvisation by Silva, Paul Richards, and Tony Franciosa, based on a scene written by Gazzo, titled "Pot"), it proved so successful that it was presented on Broadway, with students Ben Gazzara, Shelley Winters, Harry Guardino, along with Franciosa, Richards, and Silva, in key roles. Silva also appeared in the play's film version.

Early film roles and typecasting

His Hollywood debut was an uncredited appearance in Elia Kazan’s 1952 Viva Zapata!. Silva then went on to play a succession of villains in films including The Tall T (1957) with Randolph Scott, The Bravados (1958) with Gregory Peck, and The Law and Jake Wade (1958). 

In the 1959 adventure film Green Mansions, he played a forest-dwelling Venezuela native known as Kua-Ko who tries to murder a young woman played by Audrey Hepburn.

Silva was one of the eleven casino robbers in the 1960 Rat Pack caper film Ocean's 11, starring Frank Sinatra, Dean Martin, Sammy Davis Jr., and Peter Lawford. He also played the communist agent Chunjin in the original The Manchurian Candidate (1962), again opposite Sinatra, and portrayed a Native American in Sinatra's and Martin's Rat Pack Western Sergeants 3 that same year.

Silva gradually became typecast playing mobsters, robbers, and other criminals. In 1956, he appeared as a hitman in the episode "Better Bargain" on Alfred Hitchcock Presents. And in 1963, he starred as a mobster in the episode "An Out for Oscar" on The Alfred Hitchcock Hour. However, he did play a comic role as one of the stepbrothers in the 1960 Jerry Lewis film Cinderfella, a parody of Cinderella with Lewis in the title role.

He appeared in many television series in both guest starring and recurring roles. Other appearances include featured roles on The Outer Limits plus roles on episodes of The Untouchables, Rod Serling's Night Gallery, Voyage to the Bottom of the Sea and Mission Impossible, as well as Boris Karloff's suspense series Thriller. He also appeared in The Streets of San Francisco, Dr. Kildare, and many more shows.

In 1963, Silva played the lead role in the gangster film Johnny Cool, which was produced by United Artists and Chrislaw. His character Salvatore "Johnny Cool" Giordano was a hitman sent on a mission by exiled mobster Johnny Colini to kill the underworld figures who had plotted against the mobster. Premiering on October 19, 1963, the film enjoyed box-office success as well as critical acclaim. Critics also praised the actor's first lead performance, which allegedly carried the film.  The supporting cast features Elizabeth Montgomery, Mort Sahl, Telly Savalas, Jim Backus, Joey Bishop, and Sammy Davis Jr., most of whose characters were murdered by Johnny Cool during the course of the film. Variety praised Silva's performance, writing "Henry Silva, as a Sicilian-born assassin, is at home as the 'delivery boy of death'".

In 1965, an Italian film producer made Silva an offer to star as a hero for a change and he moved his family overseas. Silva's turning-point picture was a Spaghetti Western, The Hills Run Red (1966), which made him a hot box-office commodity in Spain, Italy, Germany, and France. Between 1966 and 1977 he starred or co-starred in at least 25 movies, the majority of which were Italian Poliziotteschi films, where he normally played the villain or hitman, or the dark hero, or a combination of the two. These include Manhunt (1972), Il Boss (1973), and Almost Human (1974).

He also appeared against type as the Japanese detective Mr. Moto in the 1965 murder mystery The Return of Mr. Moto, and as an Apache who assists rape victim Michele Carey in the 1970 revenge western Five Savage Men.

Returning to the United States in the mid-1970s, he co-starred with Frank Sinatra in Contract on Cherry Street (1977) and Charles Bronson in Love and Bullets (1979). He then signed on as the evil adversary Killer Kane in Buck Rogers in the 25th Century (1979).

1980s–2000s career
In the 1980s and 1990s, he appeared as the arrogant hunter Colonel Brock in Alligator (1980), a drug-addicted hitman in Burt Reynolds' Sharky's Machine (1981), a former prison warden-turned-enforcer in Escape from the Bronx (1983), which was lampooned on Mystery Science Theater 3000, a comedy gangster in Cannonball Run II (1984) opposite many of his former Rat Pack buddies, the villainous CIA agent Kurt Zagon in Steven Seagal's debut Above the Law (1988), the sinister mob hitman Influence in Dick Tracy (1990), and the voice of the ruthless supervillain Bane in Batman: The Animated Series (1994) and The New Batman Adventures (1998). Silva also plays the crime boss Ray Vargo in Jim Jarmusch's Ghost Dog: The Way of the Samurai (1999) who puts out a hit on the titular character.

Silva also starred as himself in a spoof of In Search of ...-type shows in the comedy Amazon Women on the Moon (1987) for a segment titled Henry Silva's "Bullshit, or Not!", and played a spectator at a boxing match in the 2001 version of Ocean's Eleven.

In 2012 he contributed to Eurocrime! The Italian Cop and Gangster Films that ruled the 70s, a feature-length documentary directed by Mike Malloy.

Personal life
Silva was married three times. His first marriage was to Mary Ramus (February 1949 - 1955) and ended in divorce. His second was on 16 March 1959 to Cindy Conroy. He was married to Ruth Earl from 4 September 1966 until it ended in divorce in November 1987. Silva and Earl had two children, both of whom were born in Los Angeles, Michael Henry Silva who was born on September 3, 1969 and Scott Stevens Silva who was born July 14, 1976.

Death
Silva died on September 14, 2022, nine days before his 96th birthday, at the Motion Picture & Television Fund home in Woodland Hills, Los Angeles.

Selected filmography
Films

 Viva Zapata! (1952) as Hernandez, a peasant who challenges "president" Zapata (uncredited)
 The Better Bargain (1956)
 Crowded Paradise (1956)
 The Tall T (1957) as "Chink"
 A Hatful of Rain (1957) as "Mother"
 The Law and Jake Wade (1958) as Rennie
 The Bravados (1958) as Lujan
 Ride a Crooked Trail (1958) as Sam Teeler
 Green Mansions (1959) as Kua-Ko
 The Jayhawkers! (1959) as Lordan
 Ocean's 11 (1960) as Roger Corneal
 Cinderfella (1960) as Maximilian
 Sergeants 3 (1962) as Mountain Hawk
 The Manchurian Candidate (1962) as Chunjin
 A Gathering of Eagles (1963) as Colonel Joe Garcia
 Johnny Cool (1963) as Salvatore Giordano / Johnny Cool
 The Secret Invasion (1964) as John Durrell, Assassin
 Je vous salue, mafia! (1965) as Schaft
 The Reward (1965) as Joaquin
 The Return of Mr. Moto (1965) as Mr. Moto
 The Plainsman (1966) as Crazy Knife
 The Hills Run Red (1966) as Garcia Mendez
 Matchless (1967) as Hank Norris
 Assassination (1967) as John Chandler / Philip Chandler
 Never a Dull Moment (1968) as Frank Boley
 Frame Up (1968) as Inspector Sterling
 Probabilità zero (1969) as Duke
  The Animals (aka Five Savage Men) (1970) as Chatto
 Man and Boy (1971) as Caine
 The Italian Connection (1972)
 Manhunt (1972) as Dave
 L'insolent (1973) as Emmanuel Ristack dit "L'insolent"
 Il Boss (1973) as Lanzetta
 Les Hommes (1973) as Everett
 Zinksärge für die Goldjungen (1973) as Luca Messina
 Cry of a Prostitute (1974) as Tony Aniante
 Almost Human (1974) as Commissario Walter Grandi
 Kidnap (1974) as Commissario Caprile
 White Fang to the Rescue (1974) as Mr. Nelson
 Manhunt in the City (1975) as David Vannucchi
 Shoot (1976) as Zeke Springer
 Crimebusters (1976) as Major Paolo Altieri
 Free Hand for a Tough Cop (1976) as Brescianelli
 Contract on Cherry Street (1977) as Roberto Obregon
 Foxbat (1977) as Michael Saxon
 Napoli spara! (1977) as Santoro
 Love and Bullets (1979) as Vittorio Farroni
 Thirst (1979) as Dr. Gauss
 Day of the Assassin (1979) as Police Chief Jorge Gomez
 Virus (1980) as General Garland
 Alligator (1980) as Colonel Brock
 Sharky's Machine (1981) as Carlos "Billy Score" Scorelli
 Wrong Is Right (1982) as Rafeeq
 Trapped (1982) as Henry Chatwill
 Megaforce (1982) as Duke Guerera
 Chained Heat (1983) as Lester
 Escape from the Bronx (1983) as Floyd Wrangler
 Le Marginal (1983) as Sauveur Meccacci
 Razza violenta (1984) as Kirk Cooper
 Cannonball Run II (1984) as 'Slim'
 Man Hunt (1985) as Prison Boss
 Killer contro killers (1985) as Sterling
 Lust in the Dust (1985) as Bernardo
 Code of Silence (1985) as Luis Comacho
 Allan Quatermain and the Lost City of Gold (1986) as Argon
 Amazon Women on the Moon (1987) as himself (segment "Bullshit or Not")
 Bulletproof (1988) as Colonel Kartiff
 Above the Law (1988) as Kurt Zagon
 Trained to Kill (1989) as 'Ace' Duran
 La via della droga (1989) as Captain Wesson
 Cyborg – Il guerriero d'acciaio (1989) as "Hammer"
 Dick Tracy (1990) as 'Influence'
 L'ultima meta (1991) as Warden Yashin
 Fists of Steel (1991) as Shogi
 The Harvest (1992) as Detective Topo
 Three Days to a Kill (1992) as Perez
 South Beach (1993) as Santiago
 The Silence of the Hams (1994) as Police Chief
 Fatal Choice (1995) as Gene Serino
 Drifting School (1995) as General Stearn
 Mad Dog Time (1996) as Joe 'Sleepy Joe' Carlisle
 The Prince (1996) as Marshall Stern
 The End of Violence (1997) as Juan Emilio
 Unconditional Love (1999) as Ted Markham
 Ghost Dog: The Way of the Samurai (1999) as Ray Vargo
 Ocean's Eleven (2001) as Boxing Spectator #1

Television

Alfred Hitchcock Presents — "Better Bargain" (1956)
The Alfred Hitchcock Hour — "An Out for Oscar" (1963)
The Outer Limits as Chino Rivera / Gen. Juan Mercurio (1963–1964) (2 episodes)
The Untouchables as Little Charlie Sebastino / Joker (1960–1962) (3 episodes)
Dr. Kildare as Ed Carson (1963) (1 episode)
Night Gallery (1971) (1 episode, "The Doll")
Daniel Boone (1964 TV series) (1965) Zapotec - S2/E3 - "The Moundbuilders"
Voyage to the Bottom of the Sea (1965) (1 episode)
Mission Impossible (1969) (1 episode)
Thriller
The Streets of San Francisco (1973) (1 episode)
 Buck Rogers in the 25th Century (1979) as Kane
 Batman: The Animated Series (1994) as Bane (1 episode)
 The New Batman Adventures (1998) as Bane (1 episode)
 Superman: The Animated Series (1998) as Bane (1 episode)

Explanatory notes

References

Further reading

External links

 
 
 

1926 births
2022 deaths
People from Brooklyn
People from Harlem
Male actors from New York City
American male film actors
American male stage actors
American male television actors
American male voice actors
Male Spaghetti Western actors
20th-century American male actors
21st-century American male actors